The 2021–22 Bryant Bulldogs men's basketball team represented Bryant University in the 2021–22 NCAA Division I men's basketball season. The Bulldogs, led by fourth-year head coach Jared Grasso, played their home games at the Chace Athletic Center in Smithfield, Rhode Island as members of the Northeast Conference. They finished the season 22–10, 16–2 in NEC play to win the regular season championship. They defeated Central Connecticut, Mount St. Mary's, and Wagner to win the NEC tournament championship. As a result, the Bulldogs received the conference's automatic bid to the NCAA tournament, the school's first-ever trip to the tournament, where they lost to Wright State in the First Four.

Senior guard Peter Kiss led NCAA Division I in scoring with a 25.2 points per game average.

On March 29, 2022, the school announced that the season was the last season for the team in the NEC as they would join the America East Conference on July 1, 2022.

Previous season
In a season limited due to the ongoing COVID-19 pandemic, the Bulldogs finished the 2020–21 season 15–7, 10–4 in NEC play to finish in second place. In the NEC tournament, they defeated Sacred Heart in the semifinals before losing to Mount St. Mary's in the championship game. They received an invitation to the College Basketball Invitational, where they lost in the quarterfinals to Coastal Carolina.

Roster

Schedule and results
NEC COVID-19 policy provided that if a team could not play a conference game due to COVID-19 issues within its program, the game would be declared a forfeit and the other team would receive a conference win. However, wins related to COVID-19 do not count pursuant to NCAA policy.

|-
!colspan=12 style=| Exhibition

|-
!colspan=12 style=| Non-conference regular season

|-
!colspan=12 style=| NEC regular season

|-
!colspan=9 style=| NEC tournament

|-
!colspan=9 style=| NCAA tournament

Sources

References

Bryant Bulldogs men's basketball seasons
Bryant
Bryant
Bryant
Bryant